is a Japanese footballer who plays for Toho Titanium.

Career
On 22 February 2019, Nishimura joined Veertien Mie.

Club statistics
Updated to 1 January 2020.

References

External links

Profile at Albirex Niigata
Profile at Montedio Yamagata

1993 births
Living people
Association football people from Nagano Prefecture
Japanese footballers
J1 League players
J2 League players
Japan Football League players
Albirex Niigata players
Japan Soccer College players
Azul Claro Numazu players
Montedio Yamagata players
Veertien Mie players
Association football defenders